Potrerillos is a caldera in Chile, in the Atacama Region. 

The caldera was active 65-56 million years ago. It and the neighbouring Cerro Vicuña and El Salvador calderas form the Indio Muerto volcanic complex, which was influenced by local faults. Later Eocene volcanism formed the rhyolitic Potrerillos lava dome.

Sources 
 

Calderas of Chile
Volcanoes of Atacama Region
Cretaceous calderas
Paleocene calderas
Eocene calderas